By the Sea may refer to:
 By the Sea (1915 film), a 1915 American silent film by Charlie Chaplin
 By the Sea (1982 film), a 1982 British TV film by Bill Wilson
 By the Sea (2015 film), a 2015 American film by Angelina Jolie
 By the Sea (novel), a 2001 novel by Abdulrazak Gurnah
 By-the-Sea, home of August Belmont in Newport, Rhode Island
 "By the Sea", a song by Suede on their 1996 album Coming Up
 "By the Sea", a song by Euphoria on their 2001 album Beautiful My Child

See also 
By the Beautiful Sea (song), lyrics include "By the Sea, By the Sea, By the Beautiful Sea"
 By the Sea, By the Sea, By the Beautiful Sea, a 1995 trilogy of three short plays by Terrence McNally, Lanford Wilson, and Joe Pintauro